Bo Abra (born 11 July 1999 in Australia) is an Australian rugby union player who plays for the  in Super Rugby. His playing position is prop. He was named in the Force wider training squad for the 2021 Super Rugby AU season and named to make his debut in round 5 of the 2022 Super Rugby Trans Tasman. He previously represented  in the 2019 National Rugby Championship and Junior Wallabies.

Reference list

External links
Rugby.com.au profile
itsrugby.co.uk profile

1999 births
Australian rugby union players
Living people
Rugby union props
Canberra Vikings players
Western Force players
Rugby union players from New South Wales